Mustapha Tettey Addy (born 1942 in Avenor, Accra, Ghana) is a Ghanaian master drummer and ethnomusicologist. Addy is the founder of The Obonu Drummers, which performs creative drumming composed by Addy that is based upon the royal Obonu drumming of the Ga people and other Ghanaian drumming forms.  He has recorded many albums and has performed extensively in Africa and Europe, and briefly in North America in the early 1970s and late 1990s.

He founded the Academy of African Music and Arts (AAMA) at Kokrobite beach near Accra in 1988.

References

External links 
Mustapha Tettey Addy biography from weltwunder.com site
Article about Addy family

1942 births
Living people
Ghanaian drummers
Musicians from Accra